Nevzorov, or Nevzorova (feminine: Невзорова), is a Russian surname. Notable people with the surname include:

 Alexander Nevzorov (born 1958), Russian and Soviet journalist, TV host and blogger.
 Boris Nevzorov (1950–2022), Soviet and Russian actor and film director
 Vladimir Nevzorov (born 1952), Russian judoka, Olympic gold medalist for the Soviet Union

Russian-language surnames